Ditropopsis is a genus of small land snails with a gill and an operculum, terrestrial gastropod mollusks in the family Cyclophoridae.

Distribution
Distribution of the genus Ditropopsis include New Guinea.

Species 
Species within the genus Ditropopsis include:
 Ditropopsis fultoni E. A. Smith, 1897
 Ditropopsis papuana E. A. Smith, 1897

References

Cyclophoridae